is a sports arcade game that was released by Namco in 1995; it runs on Namco NB-2 hardware and is the sequel to Numan Athletics, which was released in the previous year.

The players must take control of up to seven new (and selectable) Numans:
 Masala T. (Tikka) Masala (India, born in 1801) - age 194; highest speed, but lowest power 
 Johnny Sanders (United States, born on 7 August 1969) - age 25; balanced speed and power
 Makoto Kotobuki (Japan, born on 10 October 1975) - age 19; high speed, low power
In the Asia version, she is known as Li Shao-Yen (China).
 Sophia Rayleigh (United Kingdom, born on 14 July 1970) - age 24; high speed, low power
 Long Rui Huan (Communist China, born on 1 January 1953) - age 41; low speed, high power
 Michael Fletcher (Jamaica, born on 25 September 1966) - age 28; low speed, high power
 Karl Weisemann (Germany, born on 9 May 1957) - age 37; lowest speed, but highest power

All seven of these new Numans have different speed and power levels, and if less than four players are present, the CPU will randomly select up to three of the other Numans to compete against them (but they will be differently-colored); the competition takes place over five days, and on the second, third and fourth ones, there are three (four on the third day) different events that must be qualified for. If any player fails to qualify for an event on these days, they lose and will have to insert another coin and continuing in order to try again. Each of the Numans has their own unique ending sequence (much like the four lords from Exvania), which means a player will have to finish the game with all seven of them to see them all.

The starter lights on the "Hyper Glider" event also look like Pac-Man, and a picture of him also appears on the side of a passing airship (along with Prince Gilgamesh and Princess Ki from The Tower of Druaga, Momo Kanda from Wonder Momo, Valkyrie from Valkyrie no Densetsu, Hiromi Tengenji from Burning Force, and Pitt and Patti from Tinkle Pit) - while Miyuki Chan (from Ordyne) can get seen running a "Prince Paco" (from Marvel Land) taco stand, and the Dig Dug characters can be seen in the "Ground Spike" event as the crack a Numan makes in the ground goes deeper.

Reception 
In Japan, Game Machine listed Mach Breakers: Numan Athletics 2 on their April 1, 1995 issue as being the ninth most-successful arcade game of the month.

References

External links

Mach Breakers: Numan Athletics 2 at the Arcade History database

1995 video games
Arcade video games
Arcade-only video games
Japan-exclusive video games
Namco arcade games
Sports video games
Video games developed in Japan
Video games scored by Nobuyoshi Sano